Donald Roy Robbins (born c. 1934) is a former American football coach.  He was the head coach at the University of Idaho from 1970 to 1973, with a record

Playing career
An identical twin born in Fort Worth, Texas, Robbins grew up primarily in Breckenridge, one of three sons of football coach Cooper Robbins, Sr. Along with twin brother Ron, he graduated from Breckenridge High School in 1952, where his father was the head football coach for seven seasons (1945–1951), then became the freshman football coach at Texas A&M in 1952, and son Don played for him that first season.

Following Robbins' sophomore season, Paul "Bear" Bryant was hired as the head coach at A&M and Robbins was a member of the Junction Boys as a junior end in September 1954.  He graduated in 1956 and later earned a master's degree in education from A&M.

Coaching career
After coaching in Texas at Big Spring High School, Robbins became a collegiate assistant coach in 1966 at Texas Western (renamed the University of Texas at El Paso (UTEP) in 1967) under head coach Bobby Dobbs.  After two seasons in El Paso, he was hired as an assistant at Idaho in April 1968 under first-year head coach 

When McNease was dismissed after spring drills in  Robbins was promoted to head coach of the Vandals.

Robbins returned to Big Spring High School as head coach and athletic director in 1976.

Head coaching record

College

References

1930s births
Year of birth missing (living people)
Living people
Identical twin males
American football ends
Idaho Vandals football coaches
UTEP Miners football coaches
Texas A&M Aggies football players
High school football coaches in Texas
Players of American football from Fort Worth, Texas
People from Breckenridge, Texas